Monascus kaoliang is a fungus.

References

Further reading

Chayawat, Jirawun, et al. "Pigments and anti-cholesterol agent production by Monascus kaoliang KB 9 and its color mutants in rice solid cultures." Kasetsart Journal 43 (2009): 696–702.

External links

Eurotiales